John Cedric Goligher (1912–1998) was a British surgeon who specialised in diseases of the rectum and colon and in coloproctology. He was "renowned worldwide" and had "a national and international reputation" He is considered to have been "one of the preeminent clinical investigative surgeons" of his time.

Early life
John Cedric Goligher was born on 13 March 1912 in Derry, Ireland. He was educated at Foyle College. He went on to study medicine at the University of Edinburgh where he qualified with the MB ChB degree in 1934.

Career
Goligher studied at the University of Edinburgh where he attained postgraduate qualifications as a surgeon (MRCS) in 1938, and attained his professional fellowship qualifications the same year (FRCS and FRCSEd). He attained his Master of Surgery qualification nine years later in 1947 (ChM). His career began at the Royal Infirmary of Edinburgh. During World War II he worked first at St Mark's Hospital and then for five years (from 1941) in the Royal Army Medical Corps. After the war, he worked at St Mary's Hospital in London. He left London in 1955 to take up a post as Professor of Surgery at the University of Leeds and Director of the Professorial Surgical Unit at Leeds General Infirmary. He worked at Leeds until his retirement in 1978.

Professional bodies and societies
Goligher was a member of the following professional bodies: 
Royal College of Surgeons of England
Royal Society of Medicine
Association of Surgeons of Great Britain and Ireland
British Society of Gastroenterology

Fellowships and memberships
Goligher was a member or fellow of numerous British and foreign medical societies and organisations:
American College of Surgeons
American Society of Colon and Rectal Surgeons
Royal Australasian College of Surgeons
Brazilian College of Surgeons

Lectures
Goligher was in great demand as a lecturer, giving over 20 named lectures during his lifetime.

Later life
Goligher retired to Wetherby in West Yorkshire where he established a successful private practice. He died aged 85 on 18 January 1998.

Honours and awards
Goligher's honours and awards include the following:
1978 Bradshaw Lecture - Recent Trends in the Treatment of Carcinoma of the Rectum (delivered 6 November 1978)
1980 Honorary Doctor of Science (DSc) of the University of Leeds
1981 Lister Medal - The Skeptical Chirurgeon (delivered 6 April 1983)
Goliger also received honorary doctorates from: Queen's University Belfast,
the University of Gothenburg,
the University of the Republic (Uruguay),
and the University of Hull.

Legacy
The John Goligher Colorectal Surgery Unit at Leeds Hospital is named after Goligher. Memorial medals and lectures have been named for him. The Goligher retractor is named for him.

Works
Surgery of the Anus, Rectum and Colon (1961), second edition in 2000
Ulcerative Colitis (1968)

Notes

References

Further reading

1912 births
1998 deaths
British colorectal surgeons
People educated at Foyle College
Alumni of the University of Edinburgh
Academics of the University of Leeds
20th-century surgeons
Fellows of the Royal College of Surgeons
Fellows of the Royal College of Surgeons of Edinburgh
Royal Army Medical Corps officers